James Edward Shields Jr. (September 8, 1905 – November 21, 1963) was an American Negro league pitcher in 1928 and 1929.

A native of Petersburg, Virginia, Shields attended Peabody High School and Virginia Union University. He broke into the Negro leagues in 1928 with the Bacharach Giants, and posted a 3–2 record on the mound. Shields died in Petersburg in 1963 at age 58.

References

External links
 and Seamheads

1905 births
1963 deaths
Bacharach Giants players
20th-century African-American sportspeople
Baseball pitchers